The word Natalvar in Tamil means 'The ones who rule the country'. This is the name given to the Santror by Thirumal according to Ayyavazhi mythology.

See also
List of Ayyavazhi-related articles

Ayyavazhi